The Executive Council of KwaZulu-Natal is the cabinet of the executive branch of the provincial government in the South African province of KwaZulu-Natal. The Members of the Executive Council (MECs) are appointed from among the members of the KwaZulu-Natal Provincial Legislature by the Premier of KwaZulu-Natal, an office held since August 2022 by Nomusa Dube-Ncube of the African National Congress (ANC).

Mkhize premiership: 2009–2013 
After his election in the 2009 general election, Premier Zweli Mkhize announced his new Executive Council on 11 May 2009. Weeks afterwards, Bheki Cele resigned as MEC for Transport, Community Safety and Liaison, in order to become National Police Commissioner. On 29 July, Mkhize announced that Cele would be replaced by Willies Mchunu, and that Nomusa Dube-Ncube would in turn take over Mchunu's portfolio, Local Government and Traditional Affairs. In November 2011, Mkhize announced a reshuffle of his cabinet which affected four portfolios.

Senzo Mchunu premiership: 2013–2016 
When Senzo Mchunu succeeded Zweli Mkhize as Premier in September 2013, he retained Mkhize's Executive Council but appointed Peggy Nkonyeni to replace himself as MEC for Education. Following the next general election in May 2014, in which Mchunu was elected to a full term as Premier, he again largely preserved the composition of the Executive Council; he made only two new appointments, replacing the MEC for Finance and MEC for Agriculture. He also effected a minor restructuring of the Executive Council, transferring environmental affairs from the Agriculture and Rural Development portfolio to the Economic Development and Tourism portfolio.

Willies Mchunu premiership: 2016–2019 
Willies Mchunu replaced Senzo Mchunu as Premier in May 2016 and the following month he announced a reshuffle of the Executive Council, in which he fired four MECs and appointed Mxolisi Kaunda to take over his own former portfolio as MEC for Transport and Community Safety. Senzo Mchunu's supporters described the reshuffle as a purge of politicians who had supported Senzo Mchunu's failed bid to gain re-election as Provincial Chairperson of the governing ANC.

Zikalala premiership: 2019–2022 
Pursuant to the May 2019 general election, Sihle Zikalala was elected Premier and announced his new Executive Council. On 11 September 2019, he appointed Bheki Ntuli as MEC for Transport, Community Safety and Liaison; Ntuli succeeded Mxolisi Kaunda, who had left the provincial government to become Mayor of eThekwini. On 17 November 2020, Zikalala announced that Nomusa Dube-Ncube, formerly the MEC for Economic Development, Tourism and Environmental Affairs, had swopped portfolios with Ravi Pillay, formerly the MEC for Finance.  In January 2021, Ntuli died; he was replaced in March by Peggy Nkonyeni, formerly the MEC for Public Works and Human Settlement, who in turn was replaced by Jomo Sibiya.

Dube-Ncube premiership: 2022 
On 10 August 2022, Nomusa Dube-Ncube was elected Premier following Sihle Zikalala's resignation from the office; she announced her new Executive Council the following day, making several significant changes from Zikalala's cabinet. In late January 2023, the ANC announced that Zikalala would resign from his position as MEC for Cooperative Governance and Traditional Affairs in order to join the National Assembly; Bongi Sithole-Moloi took over his position in the Executive Council a week later, and Sithole's former portfolio, Agriculture and Rural Development, was in turn filled by Super Zuma.

See also 

 Template: KwaZulu-Natal Executive Council
 Government of South Africa
 Constitution of South Africa
 Natal province
 KwaZulu homeland

References 

Government of KwaZulu-Natal